Edward Norton (11 March 1750 – March 1786) was a British lawyer and politician who sat in the House of Commons from 1782 to 1786.

Norton was the fourth son of Fletcher Norton, and  his wife Grace Chapple, daughter of Sir William Chapple, and was born on 11 March 1750. He matriculated at University College, Oxford in 1766. He was admitted at Middle Temple in 1772 and was called to the bar in 1775.
   
Norton  was returned unopposed as Member of Parliament for Haslemere on Sir James Lowther's interest at the  1780 general election. At the 1784 general election  he was returned unopposed for Carlisle, again on Lowther's interest. He voted but did not speak  in Parliament.

Norton died unmarried in March 1786. It was said he was exhausted after acting as chief agent for Lowther at the Lancaster by-election. He had brothers William, Chapple and Fletcher who were also Members of Parliament.

References

1750 births
1786 deaths
Members of the Parliament of Great Britain for English constituencies
British MPs 1780–1784
British MPs 1784–1790
Younger sons of barons
Members of the Parliament of Great Britain for Carlisle